Wilhelm Karl Joseph Killing (10 May 1847 – 11 February 1923) was a German mathematician who made important contributions to the theories of Lie algebras, Lie groups, and non-Euclidean geometry.

Life

Killing studied at the University of Münster and later wrote his dissertation under Karl Weierstrass and Ernst Kummer at Berlin in 1872. He taught in gymnasia (secondary schools) from 1868 to 1872. He became a professor at the seminary college Collegium Hosianum in Braunsberg (now Braniewo). He took holy orders in order to take his teaching position. He became rector of the college and chair of the town council. As a professor and administrator Killing was widely liked and respected. Finally, in 1892 he became professor at the University of Münster.

In 1886, Killing and his spouse entered the Third Order of Franciscans.

Work

In 1878 Killing wrote on space forms in terms of non-Euclidean geometry in Crelle's Journal, which he further developed in 1880 as well as in 1885. Recounting lectures of Weierstrass, he there introduced the hyperboloid model of hyperbolic geometry described by Weierstrass coordinates. He is also credited with formulating transformations mathematically equivalent to Lorentz transformations in n dimensions in 1885,.

Killing invented Lie algebras independently of Sophus Lie around 1880. Killing's university library did not contain the Scandinavian journal in which Lie's article appeared. (Lie later was scornful of Killing, perhaps out of competitive spirit and claimed that all that was valid had already been proven by Lie and all that was invalid was added by Killing.) In fact Killing's work was less rigorous logically than Lie's, but Killing had much grander goals in terms of classification of groups, and made a number of unproven conjectures that turned out to be true. Because Killing's goals were so high, he was excessively modest about his own achievement.

From 1888 to 1890, Killing essentially classified the complex finite-dimensional simple Lie algebras, as a requisite step of classifying Lie groups, inventing the notions of a Cartan subalgebra and the Cartan matrix. He thus arrived at the conclusion that, basically, the only simple Lie algebras were those associated to the linear, orthogonal, and symplectic groups, apart from a small number of isolated exceptions. Élie Cartan's 1894 dissertation was essentially a rigorous rewriting of Killing's paper.  Killing also introduced the notion of a root system. He discovered the exceptional Lie algebra g2 in 1887; his root system classification showed up all the exceptional cases, but concrete constructions came later.

As A. J. Coleman says, "He exhibited the characteristic equation of the Weyl group when Weyl was 3 years old and listed the orders of the Coxeter transformation 19 years before Coxeter was born."

Selected works
Work on non-Euclidean geometry

Work on transformation groups

See also
Killing equation
Killing form
Killing–Hopf theorem
Killing horizon
Killing spinor
Killing tensor
Killing vector field
Levi decomposition
G2 (mathematics)
Root system

References

External links
 

19th-century German mathematicians
20th-century German mathematicians
1847 births
1923 deaths
Academic staff of the University of Münster
People from Siegen-Wittgenstein